The Crusader, also known as the Victor Lawson Monument, is a memorial marking the grave of Chicago newspaper publisher Victor Lawson. It is in Chicago's historic Graceland Cemetery and was designed by American sculptor Lorado Taft in 1931.

History
The Crusader was created in 1931 by Lorado Taft. In Chicago's historic Graceland Cemetery, it is a monument intended to memorialize Victor F. Lawson (1850–1925), the publisher of the Chicago Daily News. The Chicago Daily News was founded by Melville E. Stone, Percy Meggy and William Dougherty in 1875. In July 1876, Lawson invested money into the publication, which was struggling, and became its business manager. By the 1890s, the paper had reached a circulation of 200,000 people. Lawson remained involved with the paper until 1925. The Crusader was commissioned by Victor Lawson's brother, Iver Lawson.

Design
The Crusader is a medieval knight, and is used to symbolize the character of Victor Lawson. Standing more than thirteen feet tall, it was carved out of a solid block of dark granite supplied by the Henry C. Smalley Granite Company of Quincy, Massachusetts. The granite was then highly polished. The knight, with a large sword and shield, was an image that Taft had contemplated for years; he used it in numerous works besides The Crusader. The original model of The Crusader was done in clay.

Unlike Taft's earlier work, The Crusader emphasizes its "sheer mass", helped by the lack of realistic details in the sculpture. The monument does not bear Lawson's name, but does have an inscription which reads, "Above all things truth beareth away victory", a quote from 1 Esdras 3:12. Stylistically, the Lawson Monument falls within Gothic Revival. The Crusader is described as "an excellent example of Taft's late style in which he blended literal realism and allegory".

See also
Eternal Silence
 List of public art in Chicago

References
Kiefer, Charles D., Achilles, Rolf, and Vogel, Neil A. "Graceland Cemetery" (pdf), National Register of Historic Places Registration Form, HAARGIS Database, Illinois Historic Preservation Agency, June 18, 2000, accessed October 8, 2011.

Notes

1931 establishments in Illinois
1931 sculptures
Graceland Cemetery
Historic district contributing properties in Illinois
Granite sculptures in Illinois
Monuments and memorials on the National Register of Historic Places in Illinois
National Register of Historic Places in Chicago
Outdoor sculptures in Chicago
Sculptures by Lorado Taft